Kamminke is a municipality in the Vorpommern-Greifswald district, in Mecklenburg-Vorpommern, Germany. It is right against the German-Polish border.

See also
 Golm War Cemetery

References

External links

Vorpommern-Greifswald